The 1952 Dartmouth Indians football team was an American football team that represented Dartmouth College as an independent during the 1952 college football season. In their tenth season under head coach Tuss McLaughry, the Indians compiled a 2–7 record, and were outscored 198 to 116. Peter Reich was the team captain.

Dartmouth played its home games at Memorial Field on the college campus in Hanover, New Hampshire.

Schedule

References

Dartmouth
Dartmouth Big Green football seasons
Dartmouth Indians football